Timothy Pangelinan Villagomez (born September 10, 1962, Saipan) is a Northern Marianan politician who served as the seventh lieutenant governor of the Northern Mariana Islands from January 9, 2006 until his resignation on April 24, 2009, under Governor Benigno R. Fitial. Villagomez took office as Lieutenant Governor on January 9, 2006, after being elected as a ticket during the 2005 gubernatorial election. Villagomez, like Fitial, was a member of the Republican Party but became a member of the Covenant Party.

Background
Villagomez is a relative of former Northern Mariana Islands Governor Pedro Tenorio and his wife, First Lady Sophia.

Scandal
In August 2008, Villagomez was indicted on felony charges relating to the misuse of government funds. On April 24, 2009, he was found guilty along with former Commerce Secretary James A. Santos and his wife Joaquina V. Santos (Villagomez's sister) relating to a scheme to defraud the Commonwealth Utilities Corp. through needless purchases of a de-scaling chemical called Rydlyme. Awaiting sentencing on July 28, 2009, Villagomez tendered his resignation on April 24.

Sentencing
Villagomez's sentencing was delayed until August 5, 2009, at which time he was sentenced to 87 months in federal prison. He was sent to the Federal Correctional Institution at Phoenix, Arizona. His brother-in-law, Santos, and his wife were sentenced to 78 months. The case was appealed to the U.S. Court of Appeals for the Ninth Circuit. Villagomez was later transferred to the U.S. Penitentiary at Tucson, Arizona with a release date of June 23, 2017.

In December 2012, the Ninth Circuit vacated Villagomez's sentence citing a mistake in calculation. On June 12, 2013, Villagomez was resentenced to 108 months, an increase of 21 months from the original.

Villagomez began his term of supervised release on June 24, 2017, in the District of Idaho.  At Villagomez’s request, his supervision was transferred to the U.S. Probation Office for the NMI, and is set to expire on June 23, 2020.

References

External links
 Lt. Governor Timothy P. Villagomez official biography

1962 births
Covenant Party (Northern Mariana Islands) politicians
Lieutenant Governors of the Northern Mariana Islands
Living people
Northern Mariana Islands prisoners and detainees
People from Saipan
Politicians convicted of conspiracy to defraud the United States
Politicians convicted of mail and wire fraud
Politicians convicted of program bribery
Prisoners and detainees of the United States federal government
Republican Party (Northern Mariana Islands) politicians